Dąbrówka Mała is a district of Katowice. It has an area of 3.68 km2 and in 2007 had 5,411 inhabitants.

During the German occupation (World War II), on April 3–4, 1940, the German police committed a massacre of 40 Poles from Katowice in Dąbrówka Mała (see Nazi crimes against the Polish nation). The occupiers also operated a Polenlager forced labour camp for Poles in Dąbrówka Mała.

Sights
Landmarks of Dąbrówka Mała include the Saint Anthony church and the former Dąbrówka Mała Gmina Office (now a healthcare center). There are two parks in the district: Park w Dąbrówce and Park Zielony Zakątek. At Plac Żołnierzy Września, the district's main square, there is a monument dedicated to Poles massacred by the Germans in Dąbrówka Mała on April 3–4, 1940.

Gallery

References

Districts of Katowice
Massacres of Poles
Nazi war crimes in Poland